Valery Denisovich Goppa (born 1939) is a Soviet and Russian mathematician.

He discovered the relation between algebraic geometry and codes. Today these codes are called Goppa codes. In 1981 he presented his discovery at the algebra seminar of the Moscow State University. In 1972 he won the best paper award of the IEEE Information Theory Society for his paper "A new class of linear correcting codes".

Selected publications

References

Russian mathematicians
Living people
Year of birth missing (living people)